WKCD (90.3 FM "Positive, Encouraging K-LOVE") is a radio station broadcasting a Religious format. Licensed to Cedarville, Ohio, United States, it serves the Dayton area. The station is owned by EMF Broadcasting.

In 2011, the Cedarville University Board of Trustees voted to divest ownership of the radio ministry to EMF Broadcasting, operators of two Christian radio formats: K-LOVE and Air1.

External links
 

KCD
Contemporary Christian radio stations in the United States
K-Love radio stations
Radio stations established in 1963
1963 establishments in Ohio
Educational Media Foundation radio stations
KCD